The 1841 New Hampshire gubernatorial election was held on March 9, 1841.

Incumbent Democratic Governor John Page defeated Whig nominee Enos Stevens with 56.33% of the vote in a re-match of the previous year's election.

General election

Candidates
Daniel Hoit, Liberty, former State Senator
John Page, Democratic, incumbent Governor
Enos Stevens, Whig, former member of the Executive Council of New Hampshire, Whig nominee for Governor in 1840

Results

Notes

References

1841
New Hampshire
Gubernatorial